The 1937 NCAA Wrestling Championships were the 10th NCAA Wrestling Championships to be held. Indiana State Teachers College in Terre Haute, Indiana hosted the tournament at their school gymnasium.

Oklahoma A&M took home the team championship with 31 points and having four individual champions.

Stanley Henson of Oklahoma A&M was named the Outstanding Wrestler.

Team results

Individual finals

References

NCAA Division I Wrestling Championship
Wrestling competitions in the United States
1937 in American sports
1937 in Indiana